Licania caldasiana is a species of tree in the family Chrysobalanaceae. It was endemic to Colombia. This mostly neotropical family has over 500 species, over 100 of them in the genus Licania alone. The species is only known from its type locality, it was collected by Mutis in the 18th century, who left no detailed notes about the location site or date.

References

caldasiana
Taxonomy articles created by Polbot